Michael Glatthaar (born 3 May 1953) is a German scholar of the Middle Ages, specializing in the documents of the Carolingians and the study of Saint Boniface. A student of Hubert Mordek, he is the author of Bonifatius und das Sakrileg (2004), a study of the saint's influence on the concept of sacrilege in the 8th-century church and afterward. In his study he identifies a number of sententiae in a Wurzburg manuscript (an important witness for the Collectio canonum Hibernensis) as connected to Boniface, proposing the title Sententiae Bonifantianae Wirceburgensis for the fifty-four capitula and chapter headings in the manuscript. He has argued for the authenticity of the 716 capitulary of Pope Gregory II which invested three papal legates with the organization of the church in Bavaria, and for its close connection to Boniface's sphere of influence.

With Hubert Mordek and Klaus Zechiel-Eckes he is the editor of the Admonitio generalis, an important Carolingian document.

References

1953 births
Living people
German male non-fiction writers